Colleen J. McElroy (born October 31, 1935 in St. Louis, Missouri) is an American poet, short story writer, editor, memoirist.

Life
She graduated from Kansas State University (1958) and from the University of Washington with a Ph.D. (1973).
She is a Professor Emeritus at the University of Washington.
She lives in Seattle, Washington.

Awards
 1978 awarded the NEA Creative Writing Fellowship for Poetry
 1985 American Book Award
 1988 Fulbright Creative Writing Fellowship, which took her to Yugoslavia
 1991 awarded the NEA Creative Writing Fellowship for Fiction
 1992 DuPont Distinguished Scholar in Residence
 1991 Rockefeller Fellowship to the Bellagio Center in Lake Como, Italy
 1993 Fulbright Creative Writing Fellowship, which took her to Madagascar.

Works

Poetry
Sidewalk Games'Webs and WeedsOut Here Even Crows Commit SuicideLothar's WifeSleeping with the moon: poemsTravelling musicBone Flames: PoemsMusic from home: selected poemsMemoirsA Long Way from St. LouieOver the Lip of the World: Among the Storytellers of MadagascarShort storiesDriving under the cardboard pines and other storiesJesus and Fat Tuesday: and other short stories

AnthologiesBest American Poetry 2001Oxford Anthology of African American LiteraturePloughsharesWhile Poets Are WatchingCaution: This Woman Brakes for Memories Paris Subway TangoCrossing the Rubicon at SeventyFurlough''

References

External links
 McElroy, Colleen J. (b. 1935) at HistoryLink

1935 births
Writers from St. Louis
Kansas State University alumni
University of Washington alumni
University of Washington faculty
Living people
American women poets
PEN Oakland/Josephine Miles Literary Award winners
American Book Award winners
American women academics
21st-century American women